Geoffry Varner (born March 2, 1987) is an American figure skater. He is the 2005 ISU Junior Grand Prix Final bronze medalist and competed at the 2006 World Junior Championships, finishing ninth. In his first year as a senior, he was given two senior Grand Prix assignments.

Programs

Competitive highlights
GP: Grand Prix; JGP: Junior Grand Prix

References

External links
 
 

American male single skaters
Living people
1987 births